The discography of Fat Wreck Chords, an independent record label based in San Francisco, consists of 345 releases: 157 studio albums, 13 live albums, 33 compilation albums, 2 demo albums, 58 EPs, 69 singles, 10 video albums, 1 documentary film, and 2 box sets.

Fat Wreck Chords was started by Fat Mike of NOFX and his then-wife, Erin Burkett, in 1990. Their first release was a reissue of NOFX's 1987 EP The P.M.R.C. Can Suck on This, originally published by Wassail Records. The label's catalog numbering system began with no. 501 for this release. Over the years the label has done several series of themed releases, including the Fat Music series of compilation albums and the Live in a Dive series of live albums. The 200–300 range of catalog numbers has been used for vinyl-only 7" singles and EPs including the Fat Club singles series, NOFX's 7" of the Month Club, and Me First and the Gimme Gimmes' "square dance series". Catalog no. FAT 700 was Wrecktrospective, a three-disc compilation of tracks from the label's first 19 years.

Fat Wreck Chords also has two subsidiary imprints, Honest Don's Records and Pink and Black Records.

Releases

References 

 
Discographies of American record labels